Hamur is a town in Ağrı Province of Turkey. It is the seat of Hamur District. Its population is 3,276 (2021). The mayor is Cesmi Ergül (AKP).

References

Populated places in Ağrı Province
Kurdish settlements in Turkey